Ato Stephens (born Ato Modibo; 19 June 1979) is a sprinter from Trinidad and Tobago who specialises in the 400 metres. He won a bronze medal at the 2003 CAC Championships, and took the silver at the 2005 edition. He is married to Cydonie Mothersille, a sprinter for the Cayman Islands.

He has competed at the Summer Olympics three times, but did not progress beyond the heats at the 2000, 2004 or 2008 editions. Stephens ran at the World Championships in Athletics in 2001, 2005 and 2007. He has also represented Trinidad and Tobago in the 4×400 metres relay. His best performances in major competitions include a third-place finish in the semifinals at the 2007 World Championships and fourth in the semifinals at the 2006 Commonwealth Games.

Stephens was coached by coach Henry Rolle.

References

External links
 

1979 births
Living people
Trinidad and Tobago male sprinters
Olympic athletes of Trinidad and Tobago
Athletes (track and field) at the 2000 Summer Olympics
Athletes (track and field) at the 2004 Summer Olympics
Athletes (track and field) at the 2008 Summer Olympics
Athletes (track and field) at the 2006 Commonwealth Games
Doping cases in athletics
Clemson Tigers men's track and field athletes
Commonwealth Games competitors for Trinidad and Tobago